Nyctemera sumatrensis is a moth of the family Erebidae first described by Franciscus J. M. Heylaerts in 1890. It is found on Malacca, Sumatra and Java.

References

Nyctemerina
Moths described in 1890